JSO may refer to:

 Cherokee County Airport (Texas)
 Jackson Symphony Orchestra (Michigan), in Jackson, Michigan
 Jackson Symphony Orchestra (Tennessee), in Jackson, Tennessee
 Jacksonville Sheriff's Office, in Jacksonville, Florida
 Jacksonville Symphony Orchestra, in Jacksonville, Florida
 Jerusalem Symphony Orchestra, In Israel
 Johnstown Symphony Orchestra, in Johnstown, Pennsylvania
 Special Operations Unit (Serbia), an elite special forces police unit
 Joint Staff Office
 Just Stop Oil, an environmental activist group in United Kingdom